Café Mambo is a bar located in Sant Antoni de Portmany, Ibiza. It is known for being the official pre party point for Pacha Ibiza, and hosting internationally known DJs such as John Digweed, Carl Cox, Erick Morillo, Benny Benassi, Paul van Dyk, Armin van Buuren, David Guetta, Martin Garrix and Swedish House Mafia  who have a weekly residency there during the summer.

BBC Radio 1 has hosted all but one of its "Weekends in Ibiza" at Cafe Mambo.

Popular Irish Radio Station RTÉ Pulse also regularly hosts events at the Mambo Studios (directly above the bar).

History

Beginning 
It was established in 1994  .

Awards 
Best Ibiza Bar award in the DJ Awards, 2007.

Notable Guests 
Dj Daniel Christie Dannii Minogue, John Digweed, Paul van Dyk, Armin van Buuren, Afrojack, David Guetta, Carl Cox, Eric Prydz, Swedish House Mafia, Benny Benassi, Erick Morillo, Coleen Rooney, Frankie Dettori, Limmy, and Elton John.

Resident DJs 
Mambo's resident DJs include Jason Bye, Andy Baxter, Dee Montero, Danny O, Ridney, Erik Hagleton, Loeca, Ryan McDermott, Doctor Feelgood

References

External links
Cafe Mambo Ibiza Official Website

Culture of Ibiza